National Highway 353 (NH 353) is highway that connects Ghorai with Khariar. It is a spur road of National Highway 53. NH-753E traverses the states of Chhattisgarh and Odisha in India.

Route
NH53 near Ghorai, Mahasamund, Bagbahara, Nuapada, NH59 near Khariar

Junctions  

  Terminal near Ghorai Mahasamund
  Terminal near Khariar.

See also
 List of National Highways in India (by Highway Number)
 List of National Highways in India
 National Highways Development Project

References

External links
 National Highways in Orissa

National highways in India
National Highways in Chhattisgarh
National Highways in Odisha